

Daniel James Immerfall (born December 14, 1955) is a former speed skater from the United States who specialised in the 500 meters.

Immerfall was born in Madison, Wisconsin, and started competing locally at a very young age. When he was 20, Immerfall won bronze at the 1976 Winter Olympics of Innsbruck on the 500 m. One month later, he won silver at the World Sprint Championships behind Swedish skater Johan Granath, though Granath did not win on any of the four distances, while Immerfall won both 500 m races. Immerfall was inducted in the National Speedskating Hall of Fame in 1987.

, Immerfall is a head referee for the International Skating Union. He has two children, Ben and Abby, who are both competitive swimmers.

Olympic career

1976, Innsbruck, Austria
 500 m: BRONZE MEDAL
 1,000 meters: 12th

1980, Lake Placid, New York
 500 m: 5th

1984, Sarajevo, Yugoslavia
 Alternate; did not compete

Personal records

References

External links
 
 
 
 
 Daniel J. Immerfall at Team USA

 Dan Immerfall at SkateResults.com 
 Personal records from Jakub Majerski's Speedskating Database
 Dan Immerfall. Wisconsin Historical Society. Retrieved on 2007-08-30.
 Historical World Records. International Skating Union (2007-06-12). Retrieved on 2007-08-30.
 Speedskating Hall of Fame – Speed Skaters. The National Speedskating Museum and Hall of Fame. Retrieved on 2007-08-30.

1955 births
Living people
American male speed skaters
Olympic bronze medalists for the United States in speed skating
Speed skaters at the 1976 Winter Olympics
Speed skaters at the 1980 Winter Olympics
Medalists at the 1976 Winter Olympics
Sportspeople from Madison, Wisconsin
World Sprint Speed Skating Championships medalists